The 1902–03 Kansas Jayhawks men's basketball team represented the University of Kansas in its fifth season of collegiate basketball. The Jayhawks were coached by 5th year head coach James Naismith, the inventor of the game.

Roster
Donald Alford
Joe Alford
Harry Allen
Clyde Allphin
Loren Ames
Albert Hicks
Arthur Pooler

Schedule

References

Kansas Jayhawks men's basketball seasons
Kansas
Kansas
Kansas